This Mortal Coil is the fifth studio release of the progressive metal band Redemption. The album was officially released on October 11, 2011. The inspiration for the album came from guitarist/keyboardist Nick van Dyk being diagnosed with cancer and told he had 3–5 years to live, only to later have that diagnosis overturned and be declared cancer-free. The album comes in both a single-disc standard edition and a two-disc deluxe edition, with the latter including a bonus disc of cover songs billed as "A Collection Of Songs Originally Recorded By Other Artists That One Would Not Expect Would Be Performed By A Progressive Metal Band, Part the First".

Track listing

Personnel

Band members
 Ray Alder - vocals (except on Precious Things)
 Nick van Dyk - guitars, keyboards
 Bernie Versailles - guitars
 Sean Andrews - bass
 Chris Quirarte - drums

Guest musicians
 Gary Wehrkamp - keyboard solos on Begin Again
 Anna Kristina - vocals on Precious Things

Production
 Drums recorded and album mixed by Neil Kernon
 All music written by Redemption
 All lyrics by Nick van Dyk
 Artwork by Travis Smith

References

External links
Official Redemption website
Redemption's Official Myspace

2011 albums
Inside Out Music albums
Redemption (band) albums